The 2012 United States presidential election in Wyoming took place on November 6, 2012, as part of the 2012 United States presidential election in which all 50 states plus the District of Columbia participated. Wyoming voters chose three electors to represent them in the Electoral College via a popular vote pitting incumbent Democratic President Barack Obama and his running mate, Vice President Joe Biden, against Republican challenger and former Massachusetts Governor Mitt Romney and his running mate, Congressman Paul Ryan.

Prior to the election, 17 news organizations considered this a state Romney would win, or otherwise considered as a safe red state. Romney carried the state with 68.64% to Obama's 27.82%, with Libertarian Gary Johnson taking 2.14%.

With 68.64% of the popular vote, Wyoming would prove to be Romney's second strongest state in the 2012 election after neighboring Utah. This is also the most recent, and sole presidential election since 1976 when Albany County failed to back the overall winner of the Electoral College, and presidency.

Caucuses

Democratic

Republican

The Republican caucuses took place between Saturday, February 11 and Wednesday, February 29, 2012. The county conventions were held March 6–10, 2012. The results of the conventions were reported on Saturday, March 10, 2012, the same day on which the Guam, Kansas, and Virgin Islands caucuses were held. After narrowly beating Santorum during the precinct caucuses in February, Romney went on to win the county conventions decisively.

The caucuses took place over a number of days to accommodate the state's geographic size and sparse population, particularly ranchers in the midst of calving season. The entire process of nominating Wyoming's delegates lasts from February until April.

Results
The precinct caucuses that took place from February 11 to February 29 are the only stage of the delegate selection process in which every registered Wyoming Republican is eligible to participate. The result of the straw polls taken at these caucuses are:

Convention
Delegates were chosen at county conventions on March 6–10 and the state convention on April 12–14.

General election

Results

Results by county

Counties that flipped from Democratic to Republican
 Albany (largest municipality: Laramie)

By congressional district
Due to the state's low population, only one congressional district is allocated. This district is called the At-Large district, because it covers the entire state, and thus is equivalent to the statewide election results.

See also
 United States presidential elections in Wyoming
 Wyoming Republican Party
 2012 Republican Party presidential debates and forums
 2012 Republican Party presidential primaries
 Results of the 2012 Republican Party presidential primaries

References

External links
The Green Papers: for Wyoming
The Green Papers: Major state elections in chronological order

2012
United States President
Wyoming